Brannavan Gnanalingam (born 20 October 1983, Sri Lanka) is a New Zealand author and practicing lawyer with the New Zealand firm Buddle Findlay at its Wellington office.

Biography

Gnanalingam was born in Sri Lanka and grew up in Lower Hutt. His debut novel Getting Under Sail was published by Lawrence and Gibson in 2011. The novel was based on a trip Gnanalingam undertook with two friends from Morocco to Ghana, which included being mistakenly detained for the French tourist killings in Mauritania. The book was praised for "the narrator’s wry honesty, miles away from the usual Africa travelogue clichés". In 2013 his second novel You Should Have Come Here When You Were Not Here was published and received positive reviews in New Zealand. The book follows a trip by a middle-aged woman to Paris, who instead of finding it the city of love, experiences it as a cold and disorienting place. The book was based on Gnanalingam's time spent in Paris between 2012 and 2013. His third novel, Credit in the Straight World (2015), his first set in New Zealand, is "a satirical account of the global financial crisis" described by the New Zealand Herald as a "tale of surreal humour and genuine insight". His fourth novel, A Briefcase, Two Pies and a Penthouse (2016), was longlisted for the 2017 Ockham New Zealand Book Awards novel of the year. 

His fifth novel published in 2017, Sodden Downstream, was shortlisted for the 2018 Ockham New Zealand Book Awards novel of the year with The Spinoff books editor Steve Braunias noting that his inclusion was "a particularly good call." In a review of the book The Pantograph Punch said, "His rendition of Kiwi idiom is some of the best you’ll read." Gnanalingam confessed to The Dominion Post, talking about Sodden Downstream, "...[T]here are so few Sri Lankan characters in New Zealand literature. I wanted to reflect that....It's...based on the fact that the Sri Lankan Civil War was something that my family and I went through, so I can write from personal experience."

His 2020 novel, Sprigs, won the 2021 Best Novel prize at the Ngaio Marsh Awards and was shortlisted for the 2021 Fiction award at the Ockham New Zealand Book Awards. The Guardian described Sprigs as "an incendiary novel" and "an important examination of racism, violence and toxic masculinity that everyone should read".

In 2022, Gnanalingam latest novel, Slow Down, You're Here, was released. The book was described as a horror novel, received critical praise and was listed as one of the best books of the year by The Spinoff.

From 2006–2016, Gnanalingam contributed to the online publication The Lumière Reader, which is now on hiatus. He covered film festivals such as Venice, Berlin, Rotterdam, and Cannes when writing for this publication. He has also written for The Spinoff, The New Zealand Listener, the New Zealand Herald and The Dominion Post. As of 2022 he was a contributing editor for Wellington-based Lawrence & Gibson publishing collective.

Select publications 
Slow Down, You're Here (Wellington: Lawrence & Gibson, 2022) ISBN 978-0-473-61732-5
Sprigs (Wellington: Lawrence & Gibson, 2020). 
Sodden Downstream (Wellington: Lawrence & Gibson, 2017). 
A Briefcase, Two Pies and a Penthouse (Wellington: Lawrence & Gibson, 2016). 
Credit in the Straight World (Wellington: Lawrence & Gibson, 2015). 
You Should Have Come Here When You Were Not Here (Wellington: Lawrence & Gibson, 2013). 
Getting Under Sail (Wellington: Lawrence & Gibson, 2011).

References

External links 

 

1983 births
Living people
21st-century New Zealand lawyers
21st-century New Zealand writers
21st-century New Zealand novelists
New Zealand male writers
New Zealand people of Sri Lankan Tamil descent
People from Lower Hutt
Sri Lankan emigrants to New Zealand